A feeder link is – according to Article 1.115 of the International Telecommunication Union´s (ITU) ITU Radio Regulations (RR) – defined as:

Each station shall be classified by the service in which it operates permanently or temporarily.

See also
 Radio station
 Radiocommunication service

References 

 International Telecommunication Union (ITU)

Radio stations and systems ITU